Terry Hughes may refer to:

 Terry Hughes (baseball), American Major League Baseball player
 Terry Hughes (director), British comedy television director
 Terry Hughes (politician), California State Legislature member
 Terry Hughes (rugby league), Australian rugby league footballer
 Terry Hughes (biologist), Irish-Australian biologist
 Terry Hughes (weightlifter), New Zealander weightlifter

See also  
 Hughes (surname)